Majestic City, traded as C T Land Development PLC, is a seven-storey commercial and shopping complex, located in Bambalapitiya, a suburb of Colombo, near the Bambalapitiya Railway Station.

The complex is owned by C T Land Development PLC. The founding chairman of the complex was Albert A. Page. Majestic City is considered as Sri Lanka's most sought-after 'Destination Centre' incorporating a diverse range of shopping outlets (240), including a food court, supermarket, children's amusement centre, banks and the Majestic Cineplex.

Construction
The complex was designed by Gemmu Fernando of the Design Group Five International (Pvt) Ltd and constructed by Tudawe Brothers Limited. Construction of the three-storey  shopping complex, with 88 tenancies, developed around a central atrium was completed in 1991 and formally opened on 4 April.

The second phase of development, comprising a cinema, food court, amusement centre and additional tenancies commenced in May 1993 was opened on 4 December 1994. It was designed by Design Group Five International and constructed by Sanken Construction (Pvt) Ltd at a cost of Rs 171 million.

An LKR176 million renovation of the building was undertaken in 2008, which included modifications to the Galle Road entrance and the atrium, together with a refurbishment of the basement food court.

In 2010 the fifth level of the complex was refurbished and three new cinemas were added, with the cinemas opening on 4 December that year.

In 2019 the owners of the centre announced that they would be commencing a Rs 450 million refurbishment of the complex, which is expected to be completed by June 2020.

Majestic Cineplex

Majestic Cineplex includes four cinemas managed by Ceylon Theaters (Pvt) Ltd,
 
MC - Platinum Cinema - 445 seats (located on level four, built in 1990 as a 2D cinema and refurbished/upgraded in 2013 to a 3D cinema using Dolby® 3D technology
MC - Ultra Cinema - 150 seats (located on level five, built in 2012)
MC - Gold Cinema - 50 seats (located on level five, built in 2012)
MC - Superior 3D Cinema - 170 seats (located on level five, built in 2012. Sri Lanka's first 3D cinema)

References

Buildings and structures in Colombo
Shopping malls in Sri Lanka
Tourist attractions in Colombo
Companies listed on the Colombo Stock Exchange
Real estate companies of Sri Lanka